Kruna (Serbo-Croatian for "crown") may refer to:

Kruna, Austro-Hungarian krone, currency of the Austro-Hungarian Empire 
Kruna, list of former populated places in Croatia
Kruna (album), Bosnian album by Buba Corelli and Jala Brat
"Kruna" (song), 2019 song by Nevena Božović that represented Serbia in the Eurovision Song Contest 2019
Kruna, pen name of Julia Perkins Ballard